Lonely Mountain is the debut album by Icelandic artist Mugison released in 2003 in a hand-stitched limited edition.

Track listing

"Sea Y" – 4:00
"Ear" – 5:43
"One Day She'll Park the Car" – 3:23
"I'm on Fire" – 4:02
"Pet" – 5:08
"Probably" – 2:45
"The Night Is Limping" – 3:57
"Poke a Pal" – 4:32

Personnel

Luis Véles – bass on "The Night Is Limping"
Omutant Moon – lyrics on "Sea Y" and in collaboration with Mugison on "I'm on Fire"
Pétur Ben – guitar and backing vocals on "Poke a Pal"
Javier Wayler – drums on "Pet"

References

2003 albums
Mugison albums